Homogentisate 1,2-dioxygenase (homogentisic acid oxidase, homogentisate oxidase, homogentisicase) is an enzyme which catalyzes the conversion of homogentisate to 4-maleylacetoacetate. Homogentisate 1,2-dioxygenase or HGD is involved in the catabolism of aromatic rings, more specifically in the breakdown of the amino acids tyrosine and phenylalanine. HGD appears in the metabolic pathway of tyrosine and phenylalanine degradation once the molecule homogentisate is produced. Homogentisate reacts with HGD to produce maleylacetoacetate, which then is further used in the metabolic pathway. HGD requires the use of Fe2+ and O2 in order to cleave the aromatic ring of homogentisate.

Enzyme active site
The active site of Homogentisate 1,2-dioxygenase was determined through the crystal structure, which was captured through the work of Titus et al. Through the crystal structure the active site was found to contain the following residues; His292, His335, His365, His371, and Glu341.  Homogentisate binds in the active site to Glu341, His335, and His371 via the Fe2+ atom. The His292 binds to the hydroxyl group of the aromatic ring. His365 binds to Glu341 via hydrogen bonding to stabilize the amino acid side chains.

Pathology 
Homegentisate 1,2 dioxygenase is involved in a type of metabolic diseases, called alkaptonuria. This disorder is due to the inability of the body to deal with homogentisate, which when oxidized by the body will produce the compound known as the ochronotic pigment, which causes a black color, and has several negative effects.
This first of these effects is that the patient’s earwax will begin to turn black or red, depends on the patient’s diet, since the blood becomes oxidized and thus turns black due to excess of the ochronotic pigment. The other effect of the ochronotic pigment is that it can accumulate in the body’s connective tissue leading to degenerative arthritis, as the person grows older. Alkaptonuria has another effect in that it can cause the urine to turn black as well if let to sit for long enough to become oxidized, though is this often a method for testing for the genetic defect. The metabolic disease is autosomal recessive, such that both parents must pass the gene on to their children in order for
child to have the defect.

Mechanism
Borowski et al. propose a mechanism for HGD in their article featured in the Journal of the American Chemical Society. They base their mechanism on results from hybrid DFT calculations with B3LYP functionals using the programs Gaussian03 and Jaguar. The opening of the aromatic ring in homogentisate is a multi-step process. In the first two steps Fe2+ coordinates to the carbonyl and ortho phenol oxygens. The iron atom is also coordinated to His335, His371, and Glu341. O2 then binds to the iron atom, subsequently reacting with the aromatic ring to form a peroxo-bridged intermediate.

In the next step, O2 is cleaved with the formation of an epoxide. This epoxide intermediate allowing radical reactions to eventually open and oxidize the six-membered ring.

References

External links 
  GeneReviews/NCBI/NIH/UW entry on Alkaptonuria
  OMIM entries on Alkaptonuria
 

EC 1.13.11